Lefteris Fafalis (born 17 February 1976 in Munich) is a West German-born, Greek cross-country skier who has competed since 1995. Competing in four Winter Olympics, he earned his best finish of 29th in the individual sprint event at Turin in 2006. Fafalis carried the Greek flag at the opening ceremonies of those same games.

His best finish at the FIS Nordic World Ski Championships was 18th in the team sprint event at Sapporo in 2007.

Fafalis' best World cup finish was 17th in a sprint event at the Czech Republic in 2005.

References

 Story

1976 births
Living people
Greek male cross-country skiers
Cross-country skiers at the 1998 Winter Olympics
Cross-country skiers at the 2002 Winter Olympics
Cross-country skiers at the 2006 Winter Olympics
Cross-country skiers at the 2010 Winter Olympics
Olympic cross-country skiers of Greece
Sportspeople from Munich